The Left Field Lounge is the area beyond the outfield fence in Dudy Noble Field, Polk-DeMent Stadium at Mississippi State University.  It has been named the "#1 place to watch college baseball", and among the "100 things you gotta do before you graduate" by Sports Illustrated.

The author John Grisham, alumnus of Mississippi State and fan of MSU college baseball wrote an introduction about his time at MSU and in the Left Field Lounge in his book Inside Dudy Noble: A Celebration of Mississippi State Baseball, he.

The Left Field Lounge started in the 1960s with fans driving cars and trucks into the area to watch a game. Russ Rogers, a Starkville native, was the first to drive a pickup in to the left field and set up shop. In the late 1960s, fans started bringing grills, tables, and ice chests full of drinks for a full tailgate party experience.  At that time, fans would drive in before the game to set up their tailgates, and then take it all down after the game and drive back out.  As the area became more popular, a line would form to get in before the game, the area would fill up, and some would be turned away. In a 2003 article by a Mississippi State alumnus: In the early 1970s one truck driven to the Left Field Lounge would not start and was unable to leave after the game was over, so the owners just left the truck there.  For the next game, the truck was still there, creating what was essentially a reserved spot.   Other fans picked up on this idea and brought in trucks and grills with the intention of leaving them there.  Some trucks that were no longer functional were towed into a spot.  To allow more fans to share a space, home-built seats and bleachers were built in the beds of some of the trucks.  Later, motorhomes and flatbed trailers were brought in with more elaborate and sturdy bleachers.  Eventually, the university established rules for the spots in Left Field Lounge.  Spaces were rented for the season, and after all of the spaces were filled, those not receiving a space were placed on a waiting list.  The trucks/trailers/motorhomes had been on wheels, brought in by a certain day before the season started, and removed after the season ended.

NCAA Record Attendance
SEC weekend games typically draw the largest crowds, giving rise to large weekend gatherings. Mississippi State holds the NCAA record for the largest single-game on-campus baseball attendance at 15,586 and the largest SEC crowd for a 3-game weekend series at 29,915. In 2007 versus the Clemson Tigers, MSU had the NCAA's top two all-time highest attended Super Regional games with 12,620 and 13,715 fans.

Mississippi State has all of the top 11 on-campus crowds in the history of college baseball.  Overall, DNF-PDS has held 15 crowds over 12,000 and 31 crowds over 10,000.

Top Baseball Crowds at DNF-PDS

References

External links
LeftFieldLounge.com
Left Field Lounge Tradition
Left Field Lounge represents the best of MSU

Baseball venues in Mississippi
Buildings and structures in Oktibbeha County, Mississippi
Mississippi State Bulldogs baseball
1960s establishments in Mississippi